{{DISPLAYTITLE:C16H25NO3}}
The molecular formula C16H25O3 (molar mass: 279.37 g/mol, exact mass: 279.1834 u) may refer to:

 Axomadol
 CAR-302,196
 Moxisylyte, or thymoxamine

Molecular formulas